The Roman Catholic Archdiocese of Bertoua is the Metropolitan See for the Ecclesiastical province of Bertoua in Cameroon.

History
 17 March 1983: Established as Diocese of Bertoua from the Diocese of Doumé 
 11 November 1994: Promoted as Metropolitan Archdiocese of Bertoua

Special churches
The seat of the archbishop is Holy Family Cathedral in Bertoua.

Bishops

Ordinaries, in reverse chronological order
 Metropolitan Archbishops of Bertoua (Latin Rite), below
 Joseph Atanga, S.J. since 3 December 2009
 Roger Pirenne, C.I.C.M. 3 June 1999  – 3 December 2009
 Lambertus Johannes van Heygen, C.S.Sp. 11 November 1994  – 3 June 1999; see below
 Bishop of Bertoua (Latin Rite), below
 Lambertus Johannes van Heygen, C.S.Sp. 17 March 1983  – 11 November 1994; see above

Suffragan Dioceses
 Batouri
 Doumé–Abong’ Mbang
 Yokadouma

See also
 Roman Catholicism in Cameroon

Sources
 GCatholic.org

Bertoua
A